Van Sciver is a surname. It may refer to:

Ethan Van Sciver (born 1974), American comics artist
Noah Van Sciver (born 1984), American cartoonist
Pearl Van Sciver (1896–1966), American artist

See also
Natalie Sciver (born 1992), British cricketer

Dutch-language surnames

Surnames of Dutch origin